Ásta Ragnheiður Jóhannesdóttir (born 16 October 1949) is an Icelandic politician and was Speaker of Alþingi, Iceland's parliament. She was Iceland's Minister of Social Affairs and Social Security from 1 February 2009 – 14 May 2009. She served as speaker of the Althing from 2009 to 2013. She has been a member of the Alþing since 1995.

References

 

1949 births
Living people
Asta Ragnheidur Johannesdottir
Asta Ragnheidur Johannesdottir
Asta Ragnheidur Johannesdottir
Asta Ragnheidur Johannesdottir
Asta Ragnheidur Johannesdottir
Women legislative speakers